Relations between Eritrea and Ethiopia are historically adversarial. Eritrea gained independence from Ethiopia in 1993 after the Eritrean War of Independence, after which relations were cordial. Since independence Eritrea's relationship with Ethiopia was entirely political, especially in the resuscitation and expansion of IGAD's scope. However, the 1998 Eritrean–Ethiopian War marked a turning point, and their relationship became increasingly hostile.

Upon the selection of Abiy Ahmed as Ethiopian Prime Minister, a peace agreement was forged, and ties between the neighbouring countries were re-established on 9 July 2018. The alliance between the two countries has been strengthened since then, with Eritrean troops reportedly assisting the Ethiopian Army in the Tigray Conflict in 2020.

Country comparison

Diplomatic-political relations

History 
While Ethiopia remained independent during the colonial conquests of Africa, Italy created a colony called Eritrea around Asmara in the 19th century. After World War II and Italy's defeat, Britain occupied Eritrea. Eritrea was then federated with Ethiopia in 1952 by the ratification of UN General Assembly Resolution 390, which ignored the independence desires of the Eritrean people.

In the late 1950s, Eritreans began organising an armed rebellion from their base in Cairo. In 1962, Ethiopian Emperor Haile Selassie unilaterally dissolved the federation and annexed Eritrea, triggering a war that would last three decades.

Eritrea seceded from Ethiopia through their war of independence  (1961-1991). Eritrea's independence was formally recognised when it was admitted into the UN after a referendum in 1993.

In December 2000, Eritrea and Ethiopia signed a peace treaty ending their war and created a pair of binding judicial commissions, the Eritrea-Ethiopia Border Commission and the Eritrean-Ethiopian Claims Commission,  to rule on their disputed border and related claims. In April 2002 The Commission released its decision (with a clarification in 2003). Disagreements following the war have resulted in stalemate punctuated by periods of elevated tension and renewed threats of war. Since these decisions Ethiopia has refused to permit the physical demarcation of the border while Eritrea insists the border must be demarcated as defined by the commission. Consequently, the Boundary Commission ruled boundary as virtually demarcated and effective.

Eritrea maintains a military force on its border with Ethiopia roughly equal in size to Ethiopia's force, which has required a general mobilization of a significant portion of the population. Eritrea has viewed this border dispute as an existential threat to itself in particular and the African Union in general, because it deals with the supremacy of colonial boundaries in Africa. Since the border conflict Ethiopia no longer uses Eritrean ports for its trade.

During the border conflict and since, Ethiopia has fostered militants against Eritrea (including ethnic separatists and religiously based organizations). Eritrea has retaliated by hosting militant groups against Ethiopia as well. The United Nations Security Council argues that Eritrea and Ethiopia have expanded their dispute to a second theater, Somalia.

In March 2012, Ethiopia attacked Eritrean army outposts along the border. Addis Ababa said the assault was in retaliation for the training and support given by Asmara to subversives while Eritrea said the U.S. knew of the attacks, an accusation denied by US officials.

Abiy Ahmed premiership 
At a summit on 8 July 2018 in Asmara, Eritrean President Isaias Afewerki and Ethiopian Prime Minister Abiy Ahmed pledged to restore diplomatic relations and open their borders to each other. The next day, they signed a joint declaration formally ending the Eritrean–Ethiopian border conflict. Another peace agreement was signed in Jeddah, Saudi Arabia on 16 September later that year.

In September 2018, the increased close contacts of senior leadership in the Eritrea–Ethiopia relationship extended to the Tripartite Agreement that also included Somalia. Martin Plaut suggested that during a January 2020 trilateral meeting and bilateral Eritrea–Ethiopia visits in 2020, the leaders of the three countries discussed plans for the Tigray War prior to its official start with the 4 November 2020 Northern Command attacks.

Resident diplomatic missions 

 Eritrea has an embassy in Addis Ababa.
 Ethiopia has an embassy in Asmara.

Societal and cultural relations

Ethiopian-Eritreans Community Organizations and the Habesha Community
Throughout the Ethiopian-Eritrean Diaspora, there have been many multi-ethnic and bi-national origin community organizations founded by and for Eritreans and Ethiopians to foster good relationships, promote and express cultural commonalities well before diplomatic ties between the two countries's governments were ever restored. A majority of these organizations are found on college/university campuses throughout the United States, Canada, and other parts of the Ethiopian-Eritrean Diaspora.

References

 
Ethiopia
Bilateral relations of Ethiopia